Toyota Motor Corporation's U family is a family of automatic front-wheel drive/rear-wheel drive/four-wheel drive transmissions found in later vehicle models.

U1xx

U140E
This is the U140E for V6 models.

Applications:
 2002–2004 Camry (V6)
 2008–2010 Corolla Altis 
 2001–2003 Highlander (V6)
 1999-2003 Lexus ES 300
 1999-2003 Lexus RX 300 (FWD)

U140F

Applications:
 2001–2003 Highlander (4x4)
 2001–2012 RAV4 (4x4)
 1999–2003 Lexus RX 300 (AWD)
 2009– Matrix (2.4 L) (AWD)
 2002-2007 Caldina GT-Four (2.0L) (3S-GTE) (AWD)
 1998-2002 ST215 Caldina (AWD)
 2000-2010 Previa/Estima/Tarago (4WD)

U142E
 2001 RAV4 2wd

U150E

5 speed automatic transaxle

Gear ratios for this transmission.

Applications:
 2002-2003 ES300 (1MZ)

U151E
This is the U250E for V6 models.

5 speed automatic transaxle

Gear ratios for this transmission.

Applications:
 2003–2006 Camry (V6)   (1MZ/3MZ)
 2004–2008 Solara (V6)   (3MZ)
 2004-2010 Sienna (V6)  (3MZ/2GR-FE)
 2004-2013 Highlander (V6)  (3MZ)(2GR)
 2004-2006 Lexus RX 330 (V6)  (3MZ)
 2004-2006 Lexus ES 330 (V6) (3MZ)
 2005–2007 Avalon (V6) (2GR-FE)
 2006-2012 Rav4 (V6) (2GR-FE)
 2005–2009 Avensis (I4) (2AZ-FSE)

U151E Final Drive Ratios

U151F

5 speed automatic transaxle (4x4)

Application:
 2004–2010 Sienna (3MZ/2GR-FE AWD)
 2004–2013 Highlander (V6 AWD)
 2006–2012 RAV4 (V6 AWD)
 2003-2008 Lexus RX300, RX330, RX350 (V6 AWD)
 2006-2010 Harrier (V6) (2GR-FE)

U2xx

U240E
4 speed automatic transaxle

Gear ratios for this transmission.

Applications:
 2000–2005 Celica GT-S (2ZZ-GE)
 2003 Matrix XRS (2ZZ-GE)
 2000–2006 RunX/Allex (2ZZ-GE)
 2000-2001 Avensis VVT-i
 2001-2004 Voltz

U241E

Gear ratios for this transmission.

Applications:
 2001–2007 Highlander (2.4 2WD)
 2001–2009 Ipsum (2.4 2WD Final 2.923)
 2001–2012 RAV4 (2.0 2WD) (2.4 2WD)(2.5 2WD)
 2002–2005 Camry (4 cyl.)
 2002–2005 Avensis (4 cyl.)
 2002–2005 Solara (4 cyl.)
 2002–2007 Alphard (4 cyl.) 
 2005–2010 SCION tC
 2008-2015 SCION xB
 2006–2009 Camry* (4 cyl.)
(Camry "Aurion Version" in South east Asia 2.0 liter)
Previa

U250E
The U250E is a 5-speed version of the U241E.

Gear ratios for this transmission.

Applications:
2005–2009 Camry (4 cyl.)
2006–2009 Solara (4 cyl.)
2009–2014 Matrix (2.4 L 2AZ-FE)
2009-2010 Corolla (2.4L)

U3xx

U340E
4 speed automatic transaxle

Gear ratios for this transmission.

Application:
 2000–2005 Echo
 2004–2006 SCION xA
 2004–2006 SCION xB
 2003 Corolla (1.5 L 1NZ-FE)
 2002–2016 Vios (1.5 L 1NZ-FE)
 2006–2012 Yaris (1.5 L 1NZ-FE)

U341E

Gear ratios for this transmission.

Application:
 2000–2005 Celica GT (1.8 L) (1ZZ-FE)
 2003-2015 Corolla (1.8 L)
 2009–2014 Matrix base model (1.8 L) (2ZR-FE)
 2003-2008 Avensis (1.8 L) (1ZZ-FE)
 2001-2010 Corolla Altis (1.8 L) (1ZZ-FE)
 2008-2012 Corolla CE (1.8L); ZRE142 motor series
 2008-2014 Scion xD (1.8L) (2ZR-FE)
 2002-2007 Caldina (1.8L) (1ZZ-FE)

U341F

Application:
 2003–2006 Matrix (4x4)
 2004 Corolla/Fielder (4x4)

U6xx

Production of the U660E and U660F commenced in January 2006, Toyota's first 6-speed automatic transaxles for front-wheel-drive vehicles; transaxles feature a compact gear train that achieves six speeds using a single axis to produce a high torque of 400 Nm, and are as low cost, compact, and light as 4-speed automatic transaxles    The transaxle is a Lepelletier design which uses a simple gear set to drive a Ravigneaux planetary gear set (with long and short pinion gears in the same planet carrier).

U660E
6 speed automatic transverse (V6) 6 speed version of the U151E and F

Application:
2006-2008 Toyota Previa (V6)
2007–2017 Toyota Camry (V6)
2007–2018 Lexus ES 350
2007–2017 Toyota Aurion (V6)
2007–2012 Toyota Blade (V6)
2007–2013 Toyota Mark X Zio (V6)
2008-2018 Toyota Avalon
2009-2017 Toyota Venza
2010–2015 Lexus RX350
2011-2016 Toyota Sienna
2012- Lotus Evora ("IPS") 

u660e Final Drive Ratios

U660F
Application:
2009–Present Toyota Venza AWD
2009–Present Toyota RAV4 D-CAT A/T
2008–2012 Lexus RX 350 AWD
2011 Toyota Sienna AWD
2016 Toyota Highlander AWD

U661 E/F
6 speed automatic communicates with engine to calculate torque with reduced-friction clutch and thrust bearings multi-mode automatic transmission, electronically controlled transmission with intelligence (ECT-i) 
2015– Lexus NX200t (NX300 2019)
2016– Lexus RX200t (RX300 2019)

U760E

U760E/F
6 speed automatic transaxle (I4) 6 speed version light duty version of the U660E/F

Application:
2009–2018 Toyota Camry (2.5l I4/FWD)
2008-2016 Toyota Venza (2.7l I4/FWD)
2010-2012 Toyota Sienna (2.7l I4/FWD)
2010-2019 Toyota Highlander (2.7l I4/FWD)
2008-2018 Toyota RAV4 (2.4l I4/FWD)
2012-2018 Toyota RAV4 (2.2l I4/FWD)
2011-2016 Scion tC (2.5l I4/FWD)

U761E
Application:
2017- Toyota Camry (l4)

U760F
Application:
2009- Toyota Venza (I4/AWD)
2011- Toyota Sienna (I4/AWD)
2013-2018 Toyota RAV4 (I4/AWD)

U8xx

U880F
8 speed automatic transaxle (V6)
Application:
2012–2015 Lexus RX F-Sport (North America, V6)

U881E/F
8 speed automatic transaxle (V6)
Application:
2016– Lexus RX (V6)

UAxx

Production of the UA80E and UA80F commenced in August 2016. This transaxle features a compact gear train that achieves eight speeds using a single axis allowing for input torque up to 430Nm. It is a more compact and optimized version of the U880 automatic transmission structure with additional features for improved performance and efficiency. The marketing name for the transmission is the "Direct Shift – 8AT 8-speed automatic transmission"  Unlike the U880 transmission, which was developed for Toyota by Aisin AW, the UA80 was developed in a joint venture between Toyota and Aisin AW. Due to global application, development was done in a global fashion involving engineering resources in both Japan and the US.  The UB80E/F transmissions are used for lower torque applications, 4 cylinder engines, and rated at 280Nm.

UA80E
8 speed direct shift automatic transverse for high torque (430 Nm) applications (V6)

Application:
2017- Toyota Highlander
2017- Toyota Sienna
2019 Toyota Avalon
2019 Lexus ES 350

UA80F
Application:
2017- Toyota Highlander
2017- Toyota Sienna
2018- Toyota Alphard (V6)

UB80E/F
8 speed direct shift automatic transverse for low torque (280 Nm) applications 

Application:
2018- Toyota Camry 2.5
2019- Toyota RAV4 2.5

UP3xx

P311
CVT automatic transaxle

Application:
2007– Camry (Hybrid)
2009– Lexus HS 250h

P410
2010- Prius (Hybrid)

External links
 Toyota Transmission Code(USA)
 Lexus Transmission Code(USA)

References

U